John Sanderson-Wells (August 1872 – 16 March 1955) was a British painter. His work was part of the painting event in the art competition at the 1948 Summer Olympics.

References

1872 births
1955 deaths
20th-century British painters
British male painters
Olympic competitors in art competitions
Place of birth missing
19th-century British male artists
20th-century British male artists